Sir Thomas George Rutherford, KCSI, CIE (25 September 1886 – 5 August 1957) was a British administrator in India who served as Governor of Bihar from 1944 to 1946.

Educated at George Watson's College, the University of Edinburgh, and University College, London, Rutherford entered the Indian Civil Service in 1910.

References

Governors of Bihar
Alumni of the University of Edinburgh
Alumni of University College London
Indian Civil Service (British India) officers
Knights Commander of the Order of the Star of India
Companions of the Order of the Indian Empire